Abd Al-Bir Al-Fayumi (full name Abd Al-Bir Bin Abdulqadir Bin Mohammed Al-Aowfi Al-Fayomi (Arabic: عبد البر الفيومي); died 1171 AH / 1757/58 AD) was an Egyptian writer and scholar.

Early life and education 
Abd Al-Bir Al-Fayumi is from the Al-Fayom family in Cairo, Egypt, where he was born, raised and attended school. He travelled to Mecca before traveling to the Levant and staying in Damascus for a period of about two years,  and publishing some of his pamphlets and publications there.

Career 
Throughout his life, Abd Al-Bir Al-Fayumi held a number of different positions, however he specialized in writing, literature, and copyrighting, which helped his rise to fame. At the beginning of his career, Al-Fayumi published a book titled Montazah Al-Ayoun wa Al-Albab Fi Bae'th Al-Mota'kireen min Ahil Al-Adaab. More books followed, including Al-Lataef Al-Monefah, Hosin Al-sanee' Fi Elm Al-Badea, Al-qoul Al-wafi Beshar'h Al-Kafi, Buloog Al-Arib wa Al-Soul Bil-tsharif B'thikr Nasab Al-rasool, and At'haf Al-Nobala' B'akbaar, among others in addition to various pamphlets.

Works 
Abd Al-Bir Al-Fayumi's most notable works, with transliterated Arabic titles, include:

 Montazah Al-Ayoun wa Al-Albab Fi Bae’th Al-Mota’kireen min Ahil Al-Adaab
 Al-Lataef Al-Monefah
 Hosin Al-sanee’ Fi Elm Al-Badea
 Bade’yah (Ala Harf Al-noon)
 Al-qoul Al-wafi Beshar'h Al-Kaf.
 Buloog Al-Arib wa Al-Soul Bil-tsharif B'thikr Nasab Al-rasool
 At'haf Al-Nobala' B'akbaar

References 

Egyptian writers
Arab scholars
Egyptian scholars
1750s deaths
Year of birth missing
Year of death uncertain